Sidore Rafenoarinosy (born 19 June 1984) is a retired Malagasy football midfielder.

References

1984 births
Living people
Malagasy footballers
Madagascar international footballers
Ecoredipharm players
Petite Rivière Noire FC players
Association football midfielders
Malagasy expatriate footballers
Expatriate footballers in Mauritius
Malagasy expatriate sportspeople in Mauritius